Jeffrey Ket (born 6 April 1993) is a Dutch footballer who plays as a centre back for Quick Boys. He formerly played for AS Trenčín, Oss, Telstar, Dordrecht and Pandurii Târgu Jiu.

External links
 
 Futbalnet profile 
 Voetbal International profile 

1993 births
Living people
People from Haarlemmermeer
Dutch footballers
Association football defenders
HFC Haarlem players
SC Telstar players
FC Dordrecht players
TOP Oss players
Eerste Divisie players
AS Trenčín players
Liga I players
CS Pandurii Târgu Jiu players
Lommel S.K. players
Quick Boys players
Dutch expatriate footballers
Dutch expatriate sportspeople in Belgium
Expatriate footballers in Belgium
Dutch expatriate sportspeople in Romania
Expatriate footballers in Romania
Dutch expatriate sportspeople in Slovakia
Expatriate footballers in Slovakia
Footballers from North Holland